The Mousam River is a  river in York County, Maine, United States. Its primary source is Mousam Lake, located between the towns of Shapleigh and Acton, and it flows into the Atlantic Ocean just west of Kennebunk Beach. It flows through the towns of Shapleigh, Sanford and Kennebunk.

Major tributaries

Littlefield River
Middle Branch Mousam River
Square Pond, outlet

Dams

The Mousam River is one of the most heavily dammed rivers currently in the state of Maine, with a total of 13 (excluding major and minor tributaries). Most of the dams on the list below are used for hydroelectric production, while others are for impoundment and recreation, with former industrial uses. The list below is from river source to the mouth at the Atlantic Ocean:

Emery Mills Dam or Mousam Dam, Shapleigh
Mill Street Dam or Alpaca Dam, Springvale (completed 1910)
Bridge Street Dam, Springvale
Dam (name unknown), Springvale
River Street Dam or Stump Pond Dam, Sanford
Number 1 Pond Dam, Sanford (completed 1911)
Dam (name unknown), Sanford
Dam (name unknown), Sanford
New dam or Estes Lake Dam, Sanford (completed 1905)
Old Falls dam, Kennebunk   
Dane Perkins Dam, Kennebunk
Twine Mill Dam, Kennebunk
Kesslan Dam, Kennebunk

References

External links
www.mousamriver.com, website dedicated to information on the Mousam River
USGS 01069600 Mousam River at Kennebunk ME. US Geological Survey Water Resources. Retrieved on April 14, 2008.
Mousam River. Fly Fishing In Maine. Retrieved on April 14, 2008.
 
www.mousam.org, local information about the Mousam River and Mousam Lake
www.savethemousam.org, Save the Mousam - Keep our Dams

Rivers of York County, Maine
Sanford, Maine
Kennebunk, Maine
Rivers of Maine